Sarchaveh may refer to:
 Sarchaveh, Sardasht
 Sarchaveh (Sarchava), Sardasht